Cuneolina is an extinct genus of prehistoric foraminifera in the family Cuneolinidae with species from the Jurassic and Cretaceous.

 Name brought to synonymy
 Cuneolina angusta Cushman, 1919, a synonym for Textulariella angusta (Cushman, 1919)

See also 
 List of prehistoric foraminifera genera

References 

 Ellis, B. F.; Messina, A. (1940-2006). Catalogue of Foraminifera. Micropaleontology Press, American Museum of Natural History, New York

External links 
 
 

Loftusiida
Prehistoric Foraminifera genera
Mesozoic life